Bhola North-1 Gas Field is a natural gas field located in Bhola, Bangladesh. It is controlled by Bangladesh Petroleum Exploration and Production Company Limited (BAPEX).

Location
Bhola North-1 gas field is located at Bheduria in Bhola district, Barisal Division. It is located 32 km away from Shahbazpur gas field. It is estimated to have 600 billion cubic feet (bcf) of gas reserved in this field.

See also 
List of natural gas fields in Bangladesh
Bangladesh Gas Fields Company Limited
Gas Transmission Company Limited

References 

2018 establishments
Natural gas fields in Bangladesh
Economy of Barisal